Henry Price may refer to:

Henry Bertram Price (1869–1941), Governor of Guam
Henry Price (architect) (1867–1944), British architect
Henry Price (painter) (1819–1863), British painter and musician
Henry Price (politician) (1911–1982), British company director and politician
Sir Henry Price, 1st Baronet (1877–1963), businessman in Yorkshire, England
Henry Price (tenor) (born 1945), American opera singer
H. H. Price (1899–1984), Welsh philosopher
Henry Price (priest) (died 1706), Irish Anglican priest
Henry James Price (1919–1989), Canadian politician
Henry Strong Price (1825–1889), pioneer sheep pastoralist of South Australia

See also
Harry Price (disambiguation)